Albatros Airlines by Nella is a Venezuelan commercial airline with private capital, authorized to carry out flights for the transfer of passengers and cargo.

History

Albatros Airlines was founded on November 27, 2007 and received the Air Services Operator Certificate issued by the National Institute of Civil Aviation on May 20, 2010, to carry out commercial air transport operations, passengers, cargo and mail on an national and international level.

On May 13, 2010, the airline made its first commercial flight with a Cessna 208B Caravan from Porlamar to Carúpano. During the rest of that year, new routes were opened in the eastern region of Venezuela, with departures from Porlamar to Maturín, Cumana, Barcelona and Güiria and to Los Roques, with departures from Caracas and Maracay.

The airline has made charter flights to various international destinations, including Aruba, Curaçao, Port of Spain, and Haiti.

In mid-2010 and 2011, the airline dedicated itself exclusively to the corporate market, serving different passenger and cargo transfer companies on different national routes.

On July 27, 2012, Albatros introduced the Embraer EMB 120 Brasilia for commercial flights from Porlamar to Carúpano and Maturín, and including flights to Tucupita and Maracay and the Carúpano route to Caracas.

In the expansion project of the company, the acquisition of one Boeing 737-500 was made to increase its fleet and services. With it, it operates flights to San José, Costa Rica with two weekly frequencies, being the only direct flight between Maiquetía and San José.

On December 5, 2018, Albatros began commercial flights from Caracas to Barranquilla, on a 2-day frequency, flying non-stop direct.

On November 12, 2019, the airline received its first Airbus A320-200 from Montreal under a wet-lease scheme, landing in Porlamar, becoming the second Venezuelan commercial airline with this aircraft type, after Aeropostal Alas de Venezuela operated under this same scheme between 1998 and 2001.

On July 19, 2021 it was announced Brasilian start-up airline Nella Linhas Aéreas acquired Albatros Airlines.

Destinations

Albatros Airlines flies to the following destinations (as of January 2023):

Fleet

Current fleet

The Albatros Airlines fleet includes the following aircraft as of February 2023:

Former fleet
Albatros Airlines formerly operated the following aircraft:

See also
List of airlines of Venezuela

References

External links

Airlines of Venezuela
Airlines established in 2007
Venezuelan companies established in 2007